"Oye, ¿Dónde Está El Amor?" (English: "Listen, Where is the Love?") is the second single released from Wisin & Yandel's album Wisin vs. Yandel: Los Extraterrestres and features Franco De Vita. The live version of the song was performed with Kany García at Wisin & Yandel concert in Puerto Rico.

Samples
 Main chorus sampled from "Donde Está El Amor" by Franco De Vita.

Peak position

References

2008 singles
Wisin & Yandel songs
Music videos directed by Jessy Terrero
Contemporary R&B ballads
Franco De Vita songs
2008 songs
Songs written by Wisin
Songs written by Yandel